The Great Speckled Bird may refer to:
 "The Great Speckled Bird" (song), a southern hymn
 The Great Speckled Bird (newspaper), an Atlanta underground newspaper
 Great Speckled Bird (band), a Canadian country-rock group
 Great Speckled Bird (album), their eponymous album
 Speckled Bird (The Choir album), a 1994 album from the Christian alternative rock band